The first who used Aoki name was Aoki Shigenao (1529–1614). During Sengoku period, Aoki clan served Toyotomi clan later after the death of Toyotomi Hideyoshi, they served Tokugawa Shogunate and ruled Asada Domain, 12.000 koku.

Head Family
 Aoki Kazushige (1551–1628), son of Shigenao
 Aoki Shigekane (1607–1682)
 Aoki Shigemasa (1625–1693)
 Aoki Shigenori (1665–1729)
 Aoki Kazutsune (1697–1736)
 Aoki Kazukuni (1721–1749)
 Aoki Chikatsune
 Aoki Kazuyoshi (1728–1781)
 Aoki Kazutsura (1734–1786)
 Aoki Kazusada (1776–1831)
 Aoki Shigetatsu (1800–1858)
 Aoki Kazuoki
 Aoki Kazuhiro (1828–1856)
 Aoki Shigeyoshi (1853–1884)
 Aoki Nobumitsu (1869–1949)
 Aoki Nobutake
 Aoki Jun’ichi (b.1935)

 
Japanese clans